The First Things First 2000 manifesto, launched by Adbusters magazine in 1999, was an updated version of the earlier First Things First manifesto written and published in 1964 by Ken Garland, a British designer.

The 1999 manifesto was signed by a group of 33 figures from the international graphic design community, many of them well known, and simultaneously published in Adbusters (Canada), Emigre (Issue 51) and AIGA Journal of Graphic Design (United States), Eye magazine no. 33 vol. 8, Autumn 1999, Blueprint (Britain) and Items (Netherlands). The manifesto was subsequently published in many other magazines and books around the world, sometimes in translation. Its aim was to generate discussion about the graphic design profession's priorities in the design press and at design schools. Some designers welcomed this attempt to reopen the debate, while others rejected the manifesto.

The question of value-free design has been continually contested in the graphic design community between those who are concerned about the need for values in design and those who believe it should be value-free. Those who believe that design can be free from values reject the idea that graphic designers should concern themselves with underlying political questions. Those who are concerned about values believe that designers should be critical and take a stand in their choice of work, for instance by not promoting industries and products perceived to be harmful. Examples of projects that might be classified as unacceptable include many forms of advertising and designs for cigarette manufacturers, arms companies and so on. Adbusters has been a significant outlet for these ideas, especially in its commitment to detournement and culture jamming.

Thirty-three signers
 Jonathan Barnbrook
 Nick Bell
 Andrew Blauvelt
 Hans Bockting
 Irma Boom
 Sheila Levrant de Bretteville
 Max Bruinsma
 Domenico Catapano
 Siân Cook
 Linda van Deursen
 Chris Dixon
 William Drenttel
 Gert Dumbar
 Simon Esterson
 Vince Frost
 Ken Garland
 Milton Glaser
 Jessica Helfand
 Steven Heller
 Andrew Howard
 Tibor Kalman
 Jeffery Keedy
 Zuzana Licko
 Ellen Lupton
 Katherine McCoy
 Armand Mevis
 J. Abbott Miller
 Rick Poynor
 Lucienne Roberts
 Erik Spiekermann
 Jan van Toorn
 Teal Triggs
 Rudy VanderLans
 Bob Wilkinson

Notes

External links
 Text of the Manifesto
 Emigre Issue 51: First Things First
 Adbusters report on the Manifesto
 Text of the manifesto, published in Eye no. 33 vol. 8, Autumn 1999, followed by a short article.
 Andrew Howard’s article ‘There is such a thing as society’, from Eye no. 13 vol. 4.
 Published writing from Ken Garland’s website.
 "First things first - or our things first?" A short critique of the manifesto by Jan Michl 
 "The First Things First manifesto and the Politics of Culture Jamming" A scholarly article by Matt Soar, published in the journal Cultural Studies 16(4), 2002. 

Graphic design
Art manifestos
2000 documents